The 1978–79 New England Whalers season was the seventh season of the Whalers' franchise. This was the final season in the World Hockey Association, which ceased operations after the season. The Whalers (along with the Winnipeg Jets, the Edmonton Oilers, and the Quebec Nordiques) were admitted to the National Hockey League as expansion teams. The Whalers (as part of the agreement suggested by the Boston Bruins) changed their name to the Hartford Whalers. The Whalers made the playoffs, with only five teams participating in the postseason. Don Blackburn took over the team as coach before the season ended, and he became the first coach of the team in the NHL.

Offseason

Regular season

Final standings

Schedule and results

Playoffs

New England Whalers 3, Cincinnati Stingers 0 - Preliminary Round

Edmonton Oilers 4, New England Whalers 3 - Semifinals

Player statistics

Regular season
Scoring

Goaltending

Playoffs
Scoring

Goaltending

Awards and records

Transactions

Farm teams

See also
1978–79 WHA season

References

External links

New
New
New England Whalers seasons
New England
New England